ILN can refer to:

 International Lunar Network
 International Location Number, see Global Location Number
 Wilmington Air Park, formerly known as Airborne Airpark
 The Illustrated London News
 International Lawyer's Network